Darryl Norwood (born 4 December 1944) is an Australian boxer. He competed in the men's flyweight event at the 1964 Summer Olympics. At the 1964 Summer Olympics, he defeated Luis Romo of Argentina, before losing to Fernando Atzori of Italy.

References

1944 births
Living people
Australian male boxers
Olympic boxers of Australia
Boxers at the 1964 Summer Olympics
Place of birth missing (living people)
Commonwealth Games medallists in boxing
Commonwealth Games silver medallists for Australia
Boxers at the 1966 British Empire and Commonwealth Games
Flyweight boxers
Medallists at the 1966 British Empire and Commonwealth Games